Fort São José of Amura (Fortaleza de São José da Amura in Portuguese), also known locally as Amura Fort (Fortaleza de Amura), is a fortification located in the city of Bissau, region of Bissau, capital of Guinea-Bissau, in West Africa.

History

In the last quarter of the 17th century, French presence in Guinea intensified with the activities of the Senegal Company, a chartered company created to trade in slaves to the Antilles. It was in this context that the captain-major of Cacheu, António de Barros Bezerra, reported back to Lisbon the French pretensions to build a fortification in Bissau in a letter to the Portuguese sovereign dated March 4, 1687, for which they had sent ships with materials for the construction of a fort, which he managed to prevent through the local Guinean king on whose lands the projected fortress was to be built. On the same date, the royal Portuguese factor of Cacheu also informed the king of the French desire to build a fort on the islet next to Bissau, possibly the islet of Bandim.

The new governor of Cape Verde, Veríssimo Carvalho da Costa, on a visit to Guinea, also informed the sovereign about the matter, in a letter dated from Cacheu on 2 April 1687, referring to the measures agreed together with the captain-major to avoid the French establishment:

And adds:

In a letter dated 4 April, the captain-major reported the same events to the sovereign.

The fortification of Bissau was possibly not completed, since, by the Royal Charter of March 15, 1692, which constituted the Captaincy-Major of Bissau, a garrison of forty men was stipulated, and the construction of the fortress was ordered, the cost of which should be borne by the Company of Cacheu and Cape Verde, established on January 3, 1690.

The first structure was built by the Portuguese starting in 1696, under the command of Captain General José Pinheiro. It housed the trading company, Cacheu and Cape Verde Company.  The crown ceased to renew the exploration contract in 1703 which led to the abandonment of the Captaincy of Bissau on December 170, later the fortress was destroyed.

Current fortress

The current fort was built in November 1753 under the plan made by Manuel de Vinhais Sarmento, and further changes were made in 1766 by Colonel Manuel Germano da Mota. It underwent repairs from 1858 to 1860, led by Captain Januário Correia de Almeida. In the twentieth century, it was restored from the 1970s, under the guidance of architect Luis Benavente. Open to the public, it now houses the mausoleum of Amilcar Cabral.

Features

The fortification has a quadrangular plan in the Vauban style, with pentagonal bastions at the edges. In its walls 38 gunboats were opened. On its embankment, the service buildings are erected (Command House, Troop Barracks and Warehouses). The defense of the fort was complemented by a palisade that joined it to a small fort by the sea, with a square plan, with two gun placements on the land side.

Notable burials
Titina Silá
Malam Bacai Sanhá
Kumba Ialá
João Bernardo Vieira
Osvaldo Vieira

See also
Cacheu Fort
Portuguese Guinea

References

Buildings and structures in Bissau
Forts in Guinea-Bissau
1696 establishments in the Portuguese Empire
Buildings and structures completed in 1753
Portuguese forts